Soňa (Sonja) Balunová, née Buriánová (8 June 1924 — 1 February 2013) was a Czechoslovak pair skater. With Miloslav Balun, she became the 1954 European bronze medalist and a six-time national champion. She also competed in volleyball and athletics.

Balunová began working as a skating coach in Prague. She later worked in Russia (1963–1964) and Linz, Austria (three decades from 1967). She married Balun in 1950. Their daughter, Sonja Balun (born in 1955), competed for Austria in ladies' single skating.

Competitive highlights 
With Miloslav Balun

References 

1924 births
2013 deaths
Czech emigrants to Austria
Czech female pair skaters
Czechoslovak female pair skaters
European Figure Skating Championships medalists
Czech figure skating coaches
Figure skaters from Brno